The Black Isle is a peninsula within Ross and Cromarty, in the Scottish Highlands.  It includes the towns of Cromarty and Fortrose, and the villages of Culbokie, Jemimaville, Rosemarkie, Avoch, Munlochy, Tore, and North Kessock, as well as numerous smaller settlements. About 12,000 people live on the Black Isle, depending on the definition.

The northern slopes of the Black Isle offer fine views of Dingwall, Ben Wyvis, Fyrish and the deepwater anchorage at Invergordon. To the south, Inverness and the Monadhliath Mountains can be seen.

Description

Despite its name, the Black Isle is not an island but a peninsula, surrounded on three sides by the sea – the Cromarty Firth to the north, the Beauly Firth to the south, and the Moray Firth to the east.

On the fourth, western side, its boundary is broadly delineated by rivers. The River Conon, which divides Maryburgh from Conon Bridge, defines the border in the north-west.  The south-western boundary is variously considered to be either a minor tributary of the River Beauly separating Beauly (in Inverness-shire) and Muir of Ord (on the Black Isle in Ross and Cromarty), dividing the two counties and also delineating the start of the Black Isle; or alternatively, the River Beauly itself, thus including Beauly in the Black Isle despite its official placement in Inverness-shire.

There are modern road bridges across the Cromarty and Beauly Firths, which carry the A9 trunk road across the heart of the Black Isle.  The last remaining ferry is a summer service from Cromarty to Nigg. The North Coast 500 scenic route crosses the base of the peninsula.

The Black Isle is close to railway stations at Inverness and along the Far North Line to Dingwall, as well as Inverness Airport and the cruise ship terminal at Invergordon.  There are a number of hotels and B&Bs on the Black Isle itself, with many more nearby.

Land use is primarily arable farming and forestry.  Since the Kessock Ferry across the Beauly Firth was replaced by the bridge, the Black Isle has become something of a commuter zone for Inverness.

The whole of the Black Isle is part of the Presbytery of Ross.

The Black Isle has a wide variety of wildlife including several legally protected areas. It is particularly known for the chance to see bottlenose dolphins at close range, either from wildlife boat operators in Avoch and Cromarty or from the beach at Chanonry Point between Rosemarkie and Fortrose.

Castles
Castles on the Black Isle (whether ruinous or otherwise) include Castlecraig, Redcastle, and Kilcoy Castle. Cromarty House stands on the site of former Cromarty Castle and is built in part from its reclaimed stone and timbers.  Kinkell Castle has been recently restored.  Former castles of the Black Isle for which there are no physical remains include Tarradale Castle, Castle Chanonry of Ross and a mound indicating the former site of Ormond Castle.

History
Conventional middle to modern Black Isle history is well documented at a number of visitor centres and cottage museums sprinkled across the peninsula. According to the Encyclopædia Britannica Eleventh Edition, it was originally called Ardmeanach (Gaelic ard, height; maniach, monk, from an old religious house on the wooded ridge of Mulbuie), and it derived its customary name from the fact that, since snow does not lie in winter, the promontory looks black while the surrounding country is white.  However, that is only one theory amongst many.

Rosehaugh, near Avoch, belonged to Sir George Mackenzie, founder of the Advocates' Library in Edinburgh, who earned the sobriquet of "Bloody" from his persecution of the Covenanters. Redcastle, on the shore, near Killearnan church, dates from 1179 and is said to have been the earliest inhabited house in the north of Scotland. On the forfeiture of the earldom of Ross it became a royal castle (being visited by Mary, Queen of Scots), and afterwards passed for a period into the hands of the Mackenzies of Gairloch.  Previously, the Black Isle had been Munro country.

The Black Isle was one of the earliest parts of the northern Highlands to experience the clearances and was settled with many Lowland shepherds and farmers, especially from the north east.

Hugh Miller, self-taught geologist and writer, was born in Cromarty where his cottage is now a National Trust for Scotland museum.

Alexander Mackenzie, who crossed Canada overland in 1793 and gave his name to the Mackenzie River, is buried near Avoch.

Between 1989 and 1994, 93 red kites of Swedish origin were reintroduced to the Black Isle.

From 1894 until 1960 the Black Isle Railway, known officially as the Fortrose Branch, ran from Muir of Ord to Fortrose.

Education
The principal secondary school on the Black Isle is Fortrose Academy which currently has around 780 pupils. Fortrose Academy is one of the top 50 secondary Schools in Scotland  
There are a number of primary schools (listed below), most of whom transfer pupils to Fortrose Academy when they become of age, whilst the others transfer pupils to Dingwall Academy.

 Ben Wyvis Primary School
 Tore Primary School
 Avoch Primary School
 Culbokie Primary School
 Ferintosh Primary School
 Mulbuie Primary School
 Cromarty Primary School
 North Kessock Primary School
 Munlochy Primary School
 Beauly Primary School
 Tarradale Primary School

Culture
In addition to its Gaelic heritage, the Black Isle had its own dialect of North Northern Scots, used mainly among fisherfolk in Avoch and Cromarty, where it became extinct in October 2012, upon the death of Bobby Hogg, the last native speaker.

Now barely used, there are Clootie well sites at Munlochy, Jemimaville and Avoch.

Anne MacLeod, the writer, lives on the Black Isle.

Composer/musician Neil Grant is originally from Culbokie.

See also
 Easter Ross
 Ross-shire
 Cromartyshire
 Ross and Cromarty

References

External links

Black Isle Partnership website
Listen to recordings of a speaker of Scots from the Black Isle

 
Ross and Cromarty
Peninsulas of Scotland